Until the establishment of seven new provinces in 2015, Nepal was divided into 14 administrative zones (Nepali: अञ्चल; anchal) and 77 districts (Nepali: जिल्ला; jillā). The 14 administrative zones were grouped into five development regions (Nepali: विकास क्षेत्र; vikās kṣetra). Each district was headed by a Chief District Officer (CDO), who was responsible for maintaining law and order and coordinating the work of field agencies of the various government ministries.

From east to west:
Eastern Development Region:
Mechi Zone, named after the Mechi River
Kosi Zone, named after the Kosi River
Sagarmatha Zone, named after Sagarmatha (Mount Everest)
Central Development Region:
Janakpur Zone, named after its capital city
Bagmati Zone, named after the Bagmati River
Narayani Zone, named after the Narayani (lower Gandaki) River
Western Development Region:
Gandaki Zone, named after the Gandaki River
Lumbini Zone, named after Lumbini, a pilgrimage site, birthplace of Gautama Buddha
Dhaulagiri Zone, named after Dhaulagiri mountain
Mid-Western Development Region:
Rapti Zone, named after the West Rapti River
Karnali Zone, named after the Karnali River
Bheri Zone, named after the Bheri River
Far-Western Development Region:
Seti Zone, named after the Seti River
Mahakali Zone, named after  the Mahakali River

Clickable map

See also

Development Regions of Nepal (former)
List of districts of Nepal
List of village development committees of Nepal (former)
ISO 3166-2:NP

References

Former subdivisions of Nepal
Lists of subdivisions of Nepal
Subdivisions of Nepal
 
2015 disestablishments in Nepal